Déborah Gaviria (born 14 November 1978) is a Peruvian former professional tennis player.

Born in Lima, Gaviria competed on the international tour in the 1990s. She had a career high singles ranking of 635 and a best doubles ranking of 512 in the world.

Between 1994 and 1996 she featured in a total of 13 Fed Cup ties for Peru, winning seven singles and three doubles rubbers. She also represented Peru at the South American Games and was a singles bronze medalist at the 1994 tournament, held in Valencia, Venezuela.

ITF finals

Doubles: 1 (0–1)

References

External links
 
 
 

1978 births
Living people
Peruvian female tennis players
Competitors at the 1994 South American Games
South American Games medalists in tennis
South American Games bronze medalists for Peru
Sportspeople from Lima
21st-century Peruvian women
20th-century Peruvian women